Boulogne–Pont de Saint-Cloud is the western terminus of Line 10 of the Paris Métro. The station lies under the Rond-Point Rhin et Danube, near the Pont de Saint-Cloud bridge over the Seine, in the commune of Boulogne-Billancourt. The station was opened on 2 October 1981 when Line 10 was extended from Boulogne–Jean Jaurès. The station is the most westerly station on Paris Métro system.

Station layout

Gallery

References

Paris Métro stations in Boulogne-Billancourt
Railway stations in France opened in 1981